Kathy Johnson (born 1959) is an American sports commentator and former artistic gymnast.

Kathy Johnson may also refer to:
Kathy Johnson (figure skating coach), figure skating coach and modern dance instructor
Kathie Lee Johnson or Kathie Lee Gifford (born 1953), American singer and television personality

See also
Cathy Johnston or Cathy Johnston-Forbes (born 1963), American golfer
Katharine Johnson (disambiguation)